Cícero dos Santos Bezerra (born 9 June 1988), better known as Didira, is a Brazilian professional footballer who plays as an attacking midfielder for ASA.

Club career

ASA
Born in Arapiraca, Alagoas, Didira represented hometown side ASA as a youth, playing as a right back. He made his first team debut in 2006, but was sparingly used and was subsequently loaned to lowly Universal FC in the following year.

Back to ASA, Didira was converted into an attacking midfielder and became a regular starter, achieving promotion to the Série B in 2009. On 17 July 2010, he scored a brace in a 6–1 home routing of Brasiliense.

On 23 September 2011, Didira joined Série A club Atlético Mineiro on loan until the end of the year. He made his top tier debut on 2 October, replacing Triguinho in a 1–1 home draw against Ceará, and played in only one further match before terminating his contract with the club on 27 December.

Didira remained at ASA until 2015, and announced he agreed to a contract with a Chinese club in October.

CSA
On 28 November 2015, Didira was presented at CSA. The following 1 June, he moved to ABC, but left the club in the following month and returned to CSA.

Upon returning, Didira was an undisputed starter for the club, achieving four consecutive promotions (from Série D to Série A). On 7 December 2018, after previously announcing that he would leave the club, he agreed to a new one-year deal.

Honours
ASA
Campeonato Alagoano: 2009, 2011

CSA
Campeonato Brasileiro Série C: 2017
Campeonato Alagoano: 2018, 2019

References

External links

1988 births
Living people
Sportspeople from Alagoas
Brazilian footballers
Association football midfielders
Campeonato Brasileiro Série A players
Campeonato Brasileiro Série B players
Campeonato Brasileiro Série C players
Campeonato Brasileiro Série D players
Agremiação Sportiva Arapiraquense players
Clube Atlético Mineiro players
ABC Futebol Clube players
Centro Sportivo Alagoano players